Perittia daleris is a moth of the family Elachistidae. It is found in Western Australia.

The wingspan is 9.8-10.5 mm for males. The ground colour of the forewings is pale bluish grey and the hindwings are grey.

References

Moths described in 2011
Elachistidae
Moths of Australia